Belmaneh-ye Olya (also Romanized as Belmāneh-ye ‘Olyā; also known as Belmāneh-ye Rafīqābād) is a village in Mahidasht Rural District, Mahidasht District, Kermanshah County, Kermanshah Province, Iran. At the 2006 census, its population was 121, in 27 families.

References 

Populated places in Kermanshah County